The Durruti Column (Spanish: Columna Durruti), with about 6,000 people, was the largest anarchist column (or military unit) formed during the Spanish Civil War. During the first months of the war, it became the most recognized and popular military organisation fighting against Franco, and it is a symbol of the Spanish anarchist movement and its struggle to create an egalitarian society with elements of individualism and collectivism. The column included people from all over the world. Philosopher  Simone Weil fought alongside Buenaventura Durruti in the Durruti Column, and her memories and experiences from the war can be found in her book, Écrits historiques et politiques. The Durruti Column was militarised in 1937, becoming part of the 26th Division on 28 April.

History

Formation
The column was formed in Barcelona where, on 18 July 1936, the anarchists started fighting against General Goded and his armies. The republican government had done nothing to protect the city from the rebellious army under the command of General Franco; Barcelona was left undefended. Fearing attack, the anarchist and communist organisations such as CNT-FAI along with Unión General de Trabajadores (UGT), the Workers' Party of Marxist Unification ("Partit Obrer d'Unificació Marxista", POUM) and the Unified Socialist Party of Catalonia ("Partit Socialista Unificat de Catalunya", PSUC) organised themselves into militia units and took weapons from the arsenals with the support of the people responsible for the arsenals, mostly non-commissioned officers. The anarchists, under the command of Buenaventura Durruti, one of the most popular leaders of Federación Anarquista Ibérica attacked the Atarazanas/Drassanes barracks. Later on, the headquarters of the Durruti Column was attacked at Bujaraloz, halfway between Barcelona and Madrid.

On 20 July 1936, Durruti and other anarchists such as Juan García Oliver and Diego Abad de Santillán, participated in a meeting with Lluis Companys, the President of Catalonia. The next day, as the outcome of that meeting, they formed with other leftist organisations The Central Committee of the Antifascist Militias. Despite being in the majority they took only one third of the committee's seats. The committee was responsible for supplying and coordination of the actions different militias. After some time, it became dominated by the communists.

Advance
Intending to take Catalonia back from the Francoists, Durruti and his column headed toward Zaragoza, which was controlled by General Emilio Mola. They fought their first battle in Caspe, a city located about 100 kilometers southeast of Zaragoza. There they were joined by a small group of militiamen commanded by Captain Negrete from Guardia Civil. As Durruti left Barcelona, there were about 2,500 people in the column, and before they got to Zaragoza their number had increased to 6,000. The advance stopped near the city banks because Durruti became convinced by Colonel Villalba, the leader of all the republican forces, that if he reclaimed Zaragoza, he may become isolated from the rest of the fighters. Nowadays it is doubted if that was a good decision since the republican forces were greater in number; however, some state that in the event of open battle a lack of weapons and supplies could have led to total disaster. Durruti made his temporary headquarters in Bujaraloz. Waiting for the more convenient moment to attack Zaragoza turned out to be a grave mistake because, in time, Franco's forces became more powerful there and made it impossible to reclaim the city.
The offensive stopped at this point and there was no major battle. Due to the lack of armaments, most of the advances were small and were mostly initiated due to the actions of the column's guerrilla groups. Durruti was concentrating himself on helping the collective.

Death of Durruti
At the beginning of November 1936 Buenaventura Durruti with more than 3,000 people from the column directed themselves to Madrid. At the time the capital of Spain was in grave danger of being overtaken by the fascists and Federica Montseny convinced Durruti to leave Catalonia. His arrival to Madrid strengthened the morale of the inhabitants. He was ordered to defend and then started the offensive at Casa del Campo. Efficient in street battles, the militants had neither enough power nor experience to stand a chance against the disciplined and well-armed army from Morocco. Having suffered huge casualties the Durruti column escaped the battlefield. On 19 November, Durruti was shot and died in a hospital some time later. The origins of the bullet are unknown. Some say it was an action taken by the responsibility of the Soviet special forces, other that it was failure of Durruti's gun. The column was later commanded by Ricardo Sanz in Madrid and by Lucio Ruano on the Aragon Front. 
Coronel Carlos Romero Giménez had disagreements with the anarchists. He asked for Sanz's dismissal and proposed that the Column be dissolved and its men distributed among other units. In January 1937 the new general delegate of the column José Manzana allowed the militarisation of the column which then became part of the 26th Division.

After the Durruti Column
Due to the Soviet forces growing in power, the other militias were organized into regular army and the Durruti Column was transformed into the 26th infantry division. 
After the war many of the fighters were either put in prison or executed. Those who survived and escaped to France which right before the World War II experienced rise of nationalist sentiments, were put into concentration camps. After the German invasion of France many of the former anarchist fighters played an important part in the French Resistance. Some managed to escape to different countries of Latin America and stayed there for the rest of their lives, sometimes even organising with the indigenous people mini-anarchist states in the jungle, as did Antonio García Barón.

After the end of the World War II the former republican fighters experienced a huge disappointment. They hoped that the democratic countries would now liberate Spain from Franco's dictatorship. But even Mexico which was one of the most active helpers of the republicans and France after so much help refused to start fighting the dictator. Some of the anarchists, many of them former members of the Durruti Column, decided to organise their own resistance. They had their headquarters in France, many times collaborated with later formed ETA and did not stop fighting until the end of the regime.

Collectivisation
The collectivisation of the countryside started right after leaving Barcelona. Even though the column did not stop to liberate as many areas  as other columns, due to its size, it created the majority of the libertarian communes. At the beginning there were some acts of violence and some people were forced to join the collectives. But it is said that Durruti himself defended the individualists who did not want to work share their land. Such people were left having as much land as they could cultivate with their families without any hired labour and could always join the collective. Depending on the place, the individualists could have been put under more or less stronger economical pressure to make them join the commune.

Organization 
The simplest combat units were made up of roughly ten to twenty-five individuals who formed a "group", with a group delegate elected by direct democracy and subject to recall at all times. Groups federated together to form a "century" of about 100 individuals, which also elected its own delegate. Five centuries formed a "grouping" with their corresponding elected delegate. The sum of the existing groupings gave rise to the column. Its general delegate, liaising with the War Committee, was the French artillery captain named Berthomieu, who died on October 16 during the Battle of Perdiguera. It also made use of "Guerrilla Groups", such as 'The Children of the Night', 'The Black Band', 'The Dynamiters' and 'The Metalworkers', which went on missions behind enemy lines. The Durruti Column is said to be the first anarchist military formation with discipline based on solidarity, not on privileges and hierarchy. All the delegates of all ranks lacked privileges and hierarchical command, the column only obeyed orders to attack certain places.

International Group
The column also had an international group, containing fighters from several countries, including Germany, France, Italy, Morocco, Britain and the United States. Several centuries contained foreigners:

 The Sébastien Faure Century, composed of French and Italians,
 The Erich Mühsam Century, composed of Germans,
 The Sacco and Vanzetti Century.

The group grew to approximately 400 fighters, and functioned as an autonomous group within the column command structure. Although used primarily as a shock battalion, the group occasionally performed guerrilla operations. The column was almost wiped out in October 1936 after an offensive around the town of Alcubierre, 50 kilometres northeast of Zaragoza. All but two of the group (at that time numbering around 40) were killed, including the group leader, Frenchman Louis Berthomieu. New members continued to join, however, and the group fought at Madrid in November 1936, with many members continuing to serve in the 26th Division after the militarisation of the column.

Military Technical Council
The  'Military-Technical Council'  was made up of all of the delegates in the Column, its delegate was initially Enric Pérez i Farràs but he was quickly replaced by José Manzana.

 First sector. Delegate Ruano.

 1st Grouping (five centuries). Delegate José Mira
 2nd Grouping (five centuries). Delegate Liberto Roig
 3rd Grouping (five centuries). Delegate José Esplugas.

 Second Sector. Delegate Miguel Yoldi.

 4th Grouping (five centuries). Delegate José Gómez Talón
 5th Grouping (five centuries). Delegate José Tarín
 6th Grouping (five centuries). Delegate J. Silvestre.

Third sector. Delegate Mora.

 7th Grouping (five centuries). Delegate Subirats
 8th Grouping (five centuries). Delegate Edo
 9th Grouping (five centuries). Delegate R. García

 International Group. Delegate Louis Berthomieu.

 Five groups of fifty (two-hundred and fifty individuals). Delegates: Ridel, Fortin, Charpenteir, Cottin and Carles.

War committee 
A "war committee", advised by the military-technical council, coordinated the column's operations from the headquarters at Bujaraloz, where fighters were provided with services such as: health care, food and mechanic support. At the head of the war committee was the general delegate of the whole column.

 Centuries General Delegate: José Esplugas
 Groups: Miguel Yoldi
 Sectors: Rico Rionda 
 Artillery: Botet
 Armored vehicles: Bonilla
 Military advisers: Enric Pérez i Farràs and José Manzana
 General Delegate of the Column: Buenaventura Durruti
 Head of Information War Committee: Francisco Carreño

Notable members

 Louis Berthomieu (Commander of the International Group)
 Emile Cottin
 Carl Einstein
 Antonio García Barón
 Helmut Kirschey
 Carl Marzani
 Jean Mayol
 Louis Mercier-Vega
 Saïl Mohamed
 Marcel Montagut
 Ramón Rufat
 George Sossenko
 Clara Thalmann
 Paul Thalmann
 Simone Weil
 Llibertat Ródenas Rodriguez

See also
 26th Division (Spain)
 Confederal militias
 Iron Column
 International Brigades
 Spanish Foreign Legion
 Spanish Republican Army

References

Bibliography
 Abel Paz, Buenaventura Durruti 1896-1936: a libertarian soldier in the Spanish Revolution, Editions de Paris, 2000, 488 p. 
  Abel Paz and José Luis Gutiérrez Molina, Durruti en la Revolución Española, Fundación Anselmo Lorenzo de estudios libertarios, 1996, 773 p. 
 Robert Alexander, The Anarchists In The Spanish Civil War, Lim Janus Publishing Company, 1999, 509 p. 
 Posty Pierre Marqués, Spain 1936. War correspondents. The final despatch, L'Harmattan, 2008, 270 p. 
  Andreu Castells Peig, Las Brigadas internacionales de la guerra de España, Ariel, 1974, 685 p. 
 Julián Casanova (edited by Paul Preston and translated by Andrew Dowling and Graham Pollok), Anarchism, The Republic, and civil war in Spain, 1931–1939, Routledge, 2005, 229 p. 
 José Valls Peirats (edited by Chris Ealham and translated by Paul Sharkey), The CNT In The Spanish Revolution, ChristieBooks.com, 2005, 269 p. .

Confederal militias
Military units and formations of the Spanish Civil War
Defunct anarchist militant groups
Military history of Spain
Left-wing militant groups in Spain
Military units and formations established in 1936
Military units and formations disestablished in 1937
1936 establishments in Spain
1937 disestablishments in Spain